Sir William Thomas Denison  (3 May 1804 – 19 January 1871) was Lieutenant Governor of Van Diemen's Land from 1847 to 1855, Governor of New South Wales from 1855 to 1861, and Governor of Madras from 1861 to 1866.

According to Percival Serle, Denison was a man of high character and a good administrator. In his early days in Tasmania he spoke too frankly about the colonists in communications which he regarded as confidential, and this accentuated the feeling against him as a representative of the colonial office during the anti-transportation and responsible government movements. He showed great interest in the life of the colony, and helped to foster education, science and trade, during the period when Tasmania was developing into a prosperous colony. In New South Wales his task was easier, and he had no difficulty in coping adequately with the problems that arose during the early days of responsible government in Australia.

Early life
Denison was the third son of John Denison, of Ossington, M.P. for Colchester and his second wife Charlotte Estwick, his brothers were Evelyn Denison (1800–1873), the future Speaker of the House of Commons, and clergymen Edward Denison (1801–1854) and George Anthony Denison (1805–1896). He was born in London and studied at a private school in Sunbury before going to study at Eton College and the Royal Military College and entered the Royal Engineers in 1826 after spending some time in the Ordnance Survey. In November 1838 he married Caroline Hornby.

Rideau Canal, Upper Canada
Lt. Denison was one of the junior Royal Engineers who worked under Lt. Colonel John By on the Rideau Canal in Upper Canada (1826–1832). Of note, Denison carried out experiments under the direction of Lt. Col. By to determine the strength, for construction purposes of the old growth Canadian timber in the vicinity of Bytown. His findings were published by the Institution of Civil Engineers in England who bestowed upon him the prestigious Telford Medal in silver.

He returned to England in 1831 and worked at Woolwich and as an instructor at Chatham from 1833. He worked at Greenwich observatory with Ramsden's zenith sector and in 1837 he was engineer in charge of Woolwich Dockyard. He was promoted to captain in 1841 and he visited Bermuda in 1842. In 1844 he worked with the royal commission on the health of towns. Denison was knighted for his work in the Admiralty in 1846.

Governor of Van Diemen's Land

Denison was offered the position of Lieutenant-Governor of Van Diemen's Land in 1846 on the recommendation of Sir John Burgoyne, and arrived at Hobart on 25 January 1847.  Six members of the nominee Legislative Council had resigned in protest over the costs of the prison system, which was partly borne by Tasmanians, and increased by the suspension of transportation to New South Wales. There had been a strong protest from members of the Anti-Transportation League and Sir John Eardley-Wilmot had been recalled for his failure to administer. Denison was told that no convicts would be sent so that he could fix the problem. The Tasmanian Legislative Council had no quorum. Due to difficulties in appointing replacements, Denison chose to rule without a functioning Council, even though this meant he could not pass legislation, including that needed to amend some local tax laws that were subsequently found to be faulty. He became at odds with the two judges; the power of the council to levy taxes. This had arisen after a case of dog tax that John Morgan, the editor of Britannia had refused to pay. The case was taken to the Supreme Court where Chief Justice Pedder and Judge Montagu ruled that the local Act was contrary to the imperial statute which required the revenue to be set aside for use to specific local purpose. Denison thereupon charged the judges with neglect of duty in failing to identify the faults in the laws before they were enacted. He suggested that the Chief Justice should apply for leave of absence, and also found an opportunity to dismiss Montagu who was threatened with an action by a creditor. Denison was afterwards reprimanded by the Secretary of State, Earl Grey, for his conduct towards Pedder, but the dismissal of Montagu was confirmed.

A report made by Denison to the Secretary of State, in which he spoke unfavourably of the colonists as a whole, was printed as a parliamentary paper, Denison naturally became very unpopular, and this unpopularity was not lessened by his attitude to the anti-transportation movement. He, however, succeeded in conciliating some of the citizens by granting  of land in Hobart as a site for an unsectarian school.

In 1846, Grey's predecessor, Gladstone had suspended transportation of males to Tasmania for two years, and Grey had erroneously given the impression in dispatches to Denison that it would not be resumed, and Denison had passed this view on to the Legislative Council. Subsequently, the British Government began sending convicts in large numbers. The Anti-Transportation League formed to oppose transportation had the support of nearly all the leading colonists of Tasmania, and as the other colonies took the same stand success became certain. The discovery of gold in Australia, reduced crime in England and the construction of prisons in England led to a decline in the convict transport and in 1852 Lord Stanley stopped the transport of prisoners to Van Diemen's Land and Denison closed the penal settlement on Norfolk Island.

While this movement had been going on, the question of granting responsible government had come much to the front. In 1850 an act for the better government of the Australian colonies was passed, which provided that the existing nominee councils should frame electoral acts for new elected councils. A council of 16 members was elected in Tasmania, all supporting the Anti-Transportation movement, and the governor's power was now much reduced. He, however, incurred some criticism by proclaiming pre-emptive right land regulations before the new Council met. The proclamation was intended to help to keep small holders of land in Tasmania, but the large graziers and speculators defeated this by taking up large tracts of land. Denison, however, became more popular towards the end of his term. In September 1854 he received word that he had been appointed Governor of New South Wales, and when he left Hobart on 13 January 1855 he received a cheque for £2000 from the colonists to purchase a piece of plate as a memento of his sojourn among them. After correspondence with the Secretary of State he was allowed to accept this. One of his last official acts was to support the Legislative Council's request that the colony's name be changed to Tasmania.

Governor of New South Wales
Denison was appointed Governor of New South Wales on 20 January 1855. In 1856, he became both Governor of New South Wales and "Governor-General in and over all our Colonies of New South Wales, Van Diemen's Land, Victoria, South Australia and Western Australia", a role intended to encourage co-operation between the colonies. In response to the Crimean War, he strengthened Sydney's defences, strengthening the batteries on Dawes Point and building Fort Denison. He inaugurated the bicameral system of representative government in New South Wales, and showed wisdom and tact in his dealings with the problems which arose, including the handing of executive power to the new Parliament. He successfully opposed the Colonial Office's initial decision to put New England and the Clarence Valley in the new colony of Queensland. In 1859, he appointed Queensland's first Legislative Council and began the process of electing a Legislative Assembly, inaugurated on 22 May 1860. While he opened the colony's first railway in 1855, he ignored the problem of different rail gauges despite his role as Governor-General, although he was more active in developing arrangements for paying for postal connections with the United Kingdom, ameliorating inter-colonial tariffs and co-operation over the provision of lighthouses.

Denison was responsible for closing the penal colony on Norfolk Island and for resettling the mutineers of the Bounty from Pitcairn Island. He initially instructed that the Island, except for certain public reserves would be vested in the Pitcairners, and was then forced by the Colonial Office to withdraw the vesting of land, leading to a lasting grievance. When visiting New Zealand gave sensible advice to Colonel Gore Browne, which if followed, might have averted the New Zealand Wars. In November 1860 he received word that he had been appointed governor of Madras, and left Sydney on 22 January 1861.

Governor of Madras
Denison's first work was to reorganize the Sepoy army after the 1857 rebellion. He opposed separate armies for Bengal, Madras and Bombay and the introduction of Indians into the legislative councils in the presidencies and provinces. He condemned any ideas of self-rule and representation by Indians. He also opposed competition for the civil services and insisted that officers were above all to be "gentlemen".

In India his training as an engineer was useful in connexion with irrigation and public works of which he was a strong advocate. He passed a town improvement act in 1865 and revised the land revenue assessment principles. In November 1863, when Lord Elgin died, Denison for two months became Governor-General of India. During this period he recalled an order for the withdrawal of troops involved in the Sitana campaign.

In March 1866 he retired and returned to England and prepared his Varieties of Vice-Regal Life, which appeared in two volumes in 1870. In 1868 he chaired a royal commission to study the pollution of British rivers and held the post until his death. He died in East Sheen, Surrey and was survived by his wife Caroline Lucy, daughter of Admiral Sir Phipps Hornby, who he had married on 29 November 1838 (she died in 1899), six sons and four daughters (of thirteen children).

Denison took an interest in science and supported studies on the natural history of India. He corresponded with Sir Roderick Murchison but was a staunch Anglican Christian, anti-Darwinian and wrote an essay on the antiquity of man and a critique of Essays and Reviews.

Honours
The Institution of Civil Engineers in England bestowed upon him the prestigious Telford Medal in 1837 for his paper on his experiments testing the strength of Canadian timber. He was one of the first recipients of this prize.

Denison was knighted before leaving for Tasmania and was created a K.C.B. in 1856.

A federal and state electoral division in Tasmania were named for Denison. Port Denison (off the coast of Bowen, Queensland) was named after him.

Taxa named in honour of Denison
Two Indian species are named after William Denison: a fish, the Denison barb (Sahyadria denisonii ), from the Western Ghats; and a plant, Impatiens denisonii, from the Nilgiri hills.

A genus of Australian venomous snakes, Denisonia, is named in honour of William Denison.

References

Further reading
 William Denison (1870) Varieties of vice-regal life. London: Longmans, Green, and co. Volume 1 Volume 2

External links

 
 

Governors-General of India
Governors of New South Wales
Governors of Tasmania
Graduates of the Royal Military College, Sandhurst
History of Chennai
Royal Engineers officers
Military personnel from London
Rideau Canal
Knights Commander of the Order of the Bath
Fellows of the Royal Society
1804 births
1871 deaths
Colony of New South Wales people
Van Diemen's Land people
19th-century Australian public servants